The 2016 Quick Lane Bowl was a postseason college football bowl game, played at Ford Field in Detroit, Michigan, on December 26, 2016.
The third edition of the Quick Lane Bowl featured the Maryland Terrapins of the Big Ten Conference and the Boston College Eagles of the Atlantic Coast Conference.

Teams 
The game featured the Boston College Eagles against the Maryland Terrapins.

This was the twelfth meeting between the schools, with Boston College leading the all-time series 8–3 coming into the game.  Notably, Boston College and Maryland had been together in the ACC from 2005 until 2013, after which Maryland left to join the Big Ten.

Their most recent meeting had been on November 23, 2013, when the Eagles defeated the Terrapins by a score of 29–26.

Maryland

Boston College

Game summary

Scoring summary

Statistics

References

External links
 Game summary at ESPN

2016–17 NCAA football bowl games
2016
2016 Quick Lane Bowl
2016 Quick Lane Bowl
2016 in sports in Michigan
December 2016 sports events in the United States